Javier Grandoli (born 25 July 1969 in Córdoba, Argentina) is a former Argentine footballer who played for clubs of Argentina and Chile.

Teams
  Belgrano de Córdoba 1980–1985
  Atlético Paraná 1986–1989
  Deportes Provincial Osorno 1990–1992
  Deportes La Serena 1993

References
 Profile at BDFA 

1969 births
Living people
Argentine footballers
Argentine expatriate footballers
Club Atlético Belgrano footballers
C.D. Arturo Fernández Vial footballers
Deportes La Serena footballers
Chilean Primera División players
Expatriate footballers in Chile
And he wasn't a bad player.

Association footballers not categorized by position
Footballers from Córdoba, Argentina
Argentine expatriate sportspeople in Chile